Sasha discography may refer to:

Sasha (DJ) discography
Sasha (German singer) discography